Lavan Island Airport  is a regional airport located in near of city of Lavan, Hormozgan Province, in south of Iran. The airport is using by Iran Ministry of Petroleum for transferring of employees of Iran Oil Company.

Airlines and destinations

References

External links
 
 

Airports in Iran
Buildings and structures in Hormozgan Province
Transportation in Hormozgan Province